The 1943 Woolwich West by-election was held on 10 November 1943.  The byelection was held due to the death of the incumbent Conservative MP, Kingsley Wood.

The Conservative Party stood Francis Beech, a member of London County Council.  The Independent Labour Party put forward Tom Colyer as a candidate.  He was a former Labour Party Parliamentary candidate, who was working as a researcher and author.  There was also an independent candidate.  Beech won the election with a majority of the votes cast.

References

Woolwich West by-election
Woolwich West,1943
Woolwich West by-election
Woolwich West,1943
Woolwich
Woolwich West by-election